Rockside is a Cuyahoga Valley Scenic Railroad train station in Independence, Ohio. It is located on the south side of Rockside Road in Cuyahoga Valley National Park. The station was constructed by the National Park Service in the early 2000s.

References

Cuyahoga Valley Scenic Railroad stations